The 2014 West Coast Conference baseball tournament was held from May 22 through 24 at Banner Island Ballpark in Stockton, California.  The four team, double-elimination tournament, outside of the championship game, which is winner takes all, winner earned the league's automatic bid to the 2014 NCAA Division I baseball tournament.  The NCAA approved the use of experimental instant replay rules during the event.  These rules are generally only in force during the College World Series, and allow umpires to use video to review fair/foul, home run, and spectator interference calls. The WCC made history in the Gonzaga/ Santa Clara elimination game (Game 3) when they had the first collegiate baseball review in history. The feat would be repeated in the WCC Championship, marking the second time replay has been used in a collegiate baseball game.

Seeding
The top four finishers from the regular season were seeded one through four based on conference winning percentage.  The teams then played a double elimination tournament, outside of the championship game, which was winner takes all.

Tiebreakers:
x- Loyola Marymount claimed the #2 seed over Gonzaga by right of a 2–1 record against the Zags. 
y- Santa Clara claimed the #4 seed over San Diego by right of a 3–0 record against the Toreros.

Results

Box Scores

#4 Santa Clara vs. #1 Pepperdine
Pepperdine Opens WCC Championship with a 5–2 Win vs. Santa Clara

#3 Gonzaga vs. #2 Loyola Marymount
Loyola Marymount Dispatches Gonzga 5–1 in game Two of WCC Baseball Championship

#4 Santa Clara vs. #3 Gonzaga
Gonzaga Eliminates Santa Clara in Day Two of WCC Championship

#1 Pepperdine vs. #2 Loyola Marymount
Pepperdine Advances to WCC Championship Title Game after 4–1 Win vs. Loyola Marymount

#3 Gonzaga vs. #2 Loyola Marymount
Lions Set for Rematch with #29 Pepperdine for WCC Championship

WCC Championship: #2 Loyola Marymount vs. #1 Pepperdine

All-Tournament Team
The following players were named to the All-Tournament Team.

Most Outstanding Player
Aaron Brown was named Tournament Most Outstanding Player.  Brown was a pitcher and an outfielder for Pepperdine who won Friday's game to make the championship and ended his regular season 11–1. Brown would pitch 8 innings and get 7 strikeouts while giving up only 1 run and 5 hits. In the championship Brown would play center field and go 1 for 4 with 1 hit and 1 RBI while scoring another run for the Waves. In the first game in the tournament Brown would go 2 for 4 with 2 hits and scored one run for the Waves. His .375 batting average would end up as the highest batting percentage during the 2014 tournament.

References

West Coast Conference Baseball Championship
West Coast Conference baseball tournament
Tournament
West Coast Conference baseball tournament
Baseball competitions in Stockton, California
College baseball tournaments in California